The 1991 FIBA European Championship for Cadettes was the 9th edition of the European basketball championship for U16 women's teams, today known as FIBA U16 Women's European Championship. 12 teams featured in the competition, held in Estarreja, Travassô e Óis da Ribeira and Anadia, Portugal, from 20 to 28 July 1991.

The Soviet Union won their eight and last title before their dissolution that same year.

Participating teams

Preliminary round
In the Preliminary Round, the twelve teams were allocated in two groups of six teams each. The top two teams of each group advanced to the semifinals. The third and fourth place of each group qualified for the 5th-8th playoffs. The last two teams of each group qualified for the 9th-12th playoffs.

Group A

Group B

Playoffs

9th-12th playoff

5th-8th playoff

Championship playoff

Final standings

External links
Official Site

1995
Under-16 Championship
1991 in Portuguese sport
International youth basketball competitions hosted by Portugal
International women's basketball competitions hosted by Portugal
1991 in Portuguese women's sport